Sara Mulindwa or sometimes spelt as Sarah Mulindwa is a Ugandan born – United Kingdom based media personality, TV Host and sexual health educator.

Early life and education 
She attended Westminster Kingsway College (2001- 2003) and completed with a distinction in Health and Social Care, then proceeded to Thames Valley University  (2004 - 2007), graduated with a Bachelor of Science in Adult Nursing.

Career 
Between 2007 to 2012, Sarah practised as a ward nurse in Acute Medicine and from 2012, she specialized in Sexual Health and HIV. 
In November 2015, Sarah started to present Sexual Health and HIV education on Channel 4.  In 2019, she made her debut on The sex clinic. During the covid-19 pandemic period she served as a front line nurse at Chelsea and Westminster Hospital

Filmography

References

External links
Sarah Mulindwa (@sarah.mulindwa) • Instagram photos and videos

Living people
Ugandan women journalists
Ugandan journalists
People from Kampala District
People from Central Region, Uganda
Year of birth missing (living people)